FK Horizont Turnovo is a football club based in the village Turnovo near Strumica, North Macedonia. They are currently playing in the Macedonian Third League (Southeast Division).

History
The club was founded in 1950.

In 2008, the Macedonian company Horizont became Turnovo's main sponsor and the club was renamed to Horizont Turnovo. They have been a part of the Macedonian First League for 9 seasons, after winning the Macedonian Second League in 2008.

Honours
 Macedonian First League:
Runners-up (1): 2013–14

 Macedonian Second League:
Winners (1): 2007–08
Runners-up (1): 1993–94

Turnovo in Europe

Historical list of coaches

 Jugoslav Trenchovski (1 Jul 2003 - 30 Jun 2005)
 Jugoslav Trenchovski (1 Jun 2007 - 10 Sep 2007)
 Vlatko Kostov (11 Sep 2007 - 30 Jun 2008)
 Dragan Bočeski (Jul 2008 - Oct 2008)
 Zvonko Todorov (2 Nov 2008 - Dec 2008)
 Ace Stojanov (7 Dec 2008 - Mar 2009)
 Ratko Janusev (28 Mar 2010 - Jun 2010)
 Shefki Arifovski (Jul 2010 - Apr 2011)
 Ljupčo Dimitkovski (16 Apr 2011 – May 2011)
 Tome Petrov (19 May 2011 - Jun 2011)
 Dragan Hristovski (Jul 2011 – Sep 2011)
 Gordan Zdravkov (28 Sep 2011 – Jan 2012)
 Gjorgji Todorovski (2011 – 2012)
 Ljupčo Dimitkovski (1 Feb 2012 – 8 Jun 2013)
 Ali Güneş (8 Jun 2013 - Aug 2013)
 Goce Sedloski (21 Aug 2013 – 15 Jul 2014)
 Shefki Arifovski (16 Jul 2014 - 15 Sep 2015)
 Ljupčo Dimitkovski (16 Jul 2014 – Jun 2015)
 Jane Nikolovski (16 Sep 2015 – 30 Jun 2016)

References

External links
Club info at MacedonianFootball 
Football Federation of Macedonia 

 
Football clubs in North Macedonia
Association football clubs established in 1950
1950 establishments in the Socialist Republic of Macedonia